The Qarabağ 2020–21 season was Qarabağ's 28th Azerbaijan Premier League season, of which were defending champions, and will be their thirteenth season under manager Gurban Gurbanov.

Season overview

On 2 July, Qarabağ announced the return of Wilde-Donald Guerrier from Neftçi.

On 10 July, Qarabağ announced the signing of Emil Balayev.

On 19 July, Kevin Medina signed a three-year contract with Qarabağ.

On 26 July, Uroš Matić signed for Qarabağ on a three-year contract from Copenhagen.

On 1 August, Hajiagha Hajili joined Zira on loan for the season.

On 28 August, Qarabağ announced the signing of Patrick Andrade to a two-year contract, with the option of a third, from Cherno More Varna.

On 30 September, Qarabağ's match against Sabail scheduled for 4 October was postponed to allow Azerbaijan additional preparation time for their upcoming UEFA Nations League matches.

On 20 October, UEFA announced that all UEFA matches played by Azerbaijani or Armenian clubs must take place at a neutral venue due to the ongoing 2020 Nagorno-Karabakh conflict. This resulted in Qarabağ's UEFA Europe League home match against Villarreal being moved to the Başakşehir Fatih Terim Stadium in Istanbul.

On 8 December, Qarabağ's final UEFA Europa League group match, against Villarreal, was postponed as Qarabağ did not have enough players due to COVID-19 infections. The match was awarded 3-0 to Villarreal on 18 December.

On 2 January, Musa Gurbanli moved to Zira on loan for the rest of the season.

On 31 January, Wilde-Donald Guerrier left Qarabağ by mutual consent.

Squad

Out on loan

Transfers

In

Loans out

Released

Friendlies

Competitions

Premier League

Results summary

Results by round

Results

League table

Azerbaijan Cup

UEFA Champions League

Qualifying rounds

UEFA Europa League

Qualifying rounds

Group stage

Squad statistics

Appearances and goals

|-
|colspan="14"|Players away on loan:

|-
|colspan="14"|Players who left Qarabağ during the season:

|}

Goal scorers

Clean sheets

Disciplinary record

References

External links 
 Official Website

Qarabağ FK seasons
Qarabağ
Azerbaijani football clubs 2020–21 season